is a train station on the Kyoto Municipal Subway Tōzai Line, in Ukyō-ku ward, city of Kyoto, Kyoto Prefecture, Japan.

Lines
 
 (Station Number: T17)

Randen-Tenjingawa Station on the Arashiyama Main Line (Randen) of Keifuku Electric Railroad is located just above the station. Before the opening of Randen Tenjingawa Station on March 28, 2008, Kaikonoyashiro Station was the nearest Randen station.

Layout
The underground station has an island platform with two tracks.

History
 January 16, 2008 – Station begins operation as the Tōzai Line extension from Nijō to this station completed

References

Railway stations in Kyoto Prefecture
Railway stations in Japan opened in 2008